Casmir may refer to:

 Agu Casmir (born 1984), Nigerian professional soccer player
 Norman Casmir (born 1930), German fencer
 Erwin Casmir (1895–1982), German fencer
 Gustav Casmir (1874–1910), German fencer
 St. Casmir Church Mathilil, a church in Mathilil, Kerala, India

See also 
 CASMIRC
 Casimir
 Casimir effect